Unexpected Love is a 2014 Chinese romance film directed by Bowie Lau and starring Du Chun and Ying Er. It was released on 14 February 2014.

Cast
Du Chun
Ying Er
Tingjia Chen

Reception
As of 15 February, it has grossed CN¥10.5 million.

References

2010s romance films
Chinese romance films
Films directed by Bowie Lau